Gehendra Bahadur Rajbhandari (November 1923 – 23 August 1994) was the most senior Minister (working with responsibility of the Prime Minister) in Nepal from 13 April 1970 to 14 April 1971. In 1969, Rajbhandari was Minister for Palace Affairs and Foreign Affairs, and was the leader of the Nepalese delegation to the United Nations.

A man of vision, served Nepalese Government between 1951 and 1961 as Joint Secretary and Secretary in Ministries of Health, local self-government, pioneer in education field helped establish Adarsha Kanya Niketan (girls school in Patan), board member of Machhindra High School (Lagankhel, Lalitpur), teaching in Patan College, Mahendra Ratna College and Tribhuvan University, established Nepal Commerce College (Nepal Commerce Campus) as founder Principal, involved in politics and became Minister of Home, information, Foreign Affairs, Education, Health, Defense, Palace affairs, and Finance (1970-1971). Later became  Royal Nepalese Ambassador to Bangladesh.

In social field, he was founder member of Lalitpur Red Cross Chapter, Lalit Graduate Circle, Nepal Professors Association etc. He also paid a friendly visit to the Soviet Union in 1969. Nepal and Soviet union signed diplomatic relation in 1956. He died on 23 August 1994 at the age of 70.

References

1923 births
Prime ministers of Nepal
Finance ministers of Nepal
1994 deaths
Foreign Ministers of Nepal
20th-century prime ministers of Nepal